Chillicothe High School may refer to:

Chillicothe High School, Chillicothe, Ohio
Illinois Valley Central High School (formerly Chillicothe High School) in Chillicothe, Illinois
Chillicothe High School located in Chillicothe, Missouri
Chillicothe High School (Texas), Chillicothe, Texas